Havik is a surname of Dutch origin, meaning goshawk. Notable people with the surname include:

Mieke Havik (born 1957), former a road cyclist from the Netherlands.
Piotr Havik (born 1994), Dutch racing cyclist
Yoeri Havik (born 1991), Dutch cyclist riding for SEG Racing

See also:
Havik, List of Mortal Kombat characters
Håvik, a small village in Selje Municipality, in Sogn og Fjordane county, Norway
Ingrid Helene Håvik (born 1987), Norwegian songwriter and vocalist